Scebatiana was an ancient civitas of the Roman Province of Byzacena during the Roman Empire and late antiquity. The exact location of the town is unknown, but is thought to be somewhere in southern Tunisia.

Ancient Bishopric
Scebatiana was the seat of an ancient Christian bishopric, of the Roman province of Byzacena.

The only known bishop of this Ancient diocese is Vittorino, who took part in the synod gathered in Carthage by the Vandal king Huneric in 484, following which he was exiled.

The ancient bishopric survives today as a titular bishopric of the Roman Catholic Church, and the current bishop is Bulus Dauwa Yohanna.

Known previous bishops include:
 Vittorino (fl484)
 Acacio Chacón Guerra (Venezuela) 1966-1971 
 Florentino Zabalza Iturri (Brazil) 1971-1978 
 Miguel Delgado Ávila(Venezuela) 1979-1991 
 Carlito Cenzon(Philippines) 1992-2004 
 Robert Anthony Daniels (London, Ontario, Canada)  2004-2011 
 Bulus Dauwa Yohanna (Nigeria) since 1 February 2012
 Francisco César García Magán (España) since 15 january 2022

References

Roman towns and cities in Tunisia
Ancient Berber cities
Archaeological sites in Tunisia
Catholic titular sees in Africa